The Byzantine Catholic Seminary of SS. Cyril and Methodius is an American degree-granting school of theology in Pittsburgh, Pennsylvania. The seminary prepares candidates for priestly ministry to the Byzantine Catholic churches of North America. As of 2019, this includes the Ruthenian Byzantine Catholic Church, the Melkite Greek Catholic Eparchy of Newton, the Romanian Catholic Eparchy of St George's in Canton, and the Ukrainian Catholic Eparchy of Saint Josaphat in Parma

The seminary was established by the Byzantine Catholic Metropolitan Church of Pittsburgh in 1950 on Pittsburgh's Observatory Hill. In addition to the training of priests, the seminary offers programs in deacon formation as well as a cantor institute.

Academic information
The Byzantine Catholic Seminary is accredited by the Association of Theological Schools in the United States and Canada.

Degree programs
 Master of Divinity (M.Div.)
 Master of Arts in Theology (M.A.) in collaboration with and from Duquesne University
 Master of Arts in Byzantine Catholic Theology (M.A.T.)

Online programs
 Certificate in Eastern Christian Studies (C.E.C.S.)

Non-degree programs
 Certificate in Eastern Christian Studies (C.E.C.S.)
 Cantor Institute
 Deacon Formation Program

References

External links
Official website
Byzantine Catholic Archeparchy of Pittsburgh website

Byzantine Catholic Metropolia of Pittsburgh
Catholic seminaries in the United States
Universities and colleges in Pittsburgh
Christianity in Pittsburgh
Educational institutions established in 1950
Eastern Catholicism in Pennsylvania
1950 establishments in Pennsylvania
Rusyn-American culture in Pennsylvania